Negrilești may refer to several places in Romania:

 Negrilești, Bistrița-Năsăud, a commune in Bistrița-Năsăud County
 Negrilești, Vrancea, a commune in Vrancea County
 Negrilești, Galați, a commune in Galați County
 Negrilești, a village in Scurtu Mare Commune, Teleorman County